Concarneau (meaning Bay of Cornouaille) is a commune in the Finistère department of Brittany in north-western France. Concarneau is bordered to the west by the Baie de La Forêt.

The town has two distinct areas: the modern town on the mainland and the medieval Ville Close, a walled town on a long island in the centre of the harbour. Historically, the old town was a centre of shipbuilding, and its ramparts date from the 14th century. The Ville Close is now devoted to tourism with many restaurants and shops aimed at tourists. However restraint has been shown in resisting the worst excesses of souvenir shops. Also in the Ville Close is the fishing museum. The Ville Close is connected to the town by a bridge and at the other end a ferry to the village of Lanriec on the other side of the harbour.

Events
In August the town holds the annual Fête des Filets Bleus (Festival of the blue nets). The festival, named after the traditional blue nets of Concarneau's fishing fleet, is a celebration of Breton and pan-Celtic culture. Such festivals can occur throughout Brittany but the Filets Bleus is one of the oldest and largest, attracting in excess of a thousand participants in traditional dress with many times that number of observers. In 2005, the 100th festival was celebrated.

Literature
Concarneau was the setting for Belgian mystery writer Georges Simenon's 1931 novel Le Chien jaune (The Yellow Dog), featuring his celebrated sleuth Maigret.

Economy
Fishing,  particularly for tuna, has long been the primary economic activity in Concarneau. The Les Mouettes d'Arvor is one of the last traditional canning factories in Concarneau. Concarneau is one of the biggest fishing ports in France. Since the 1980s, other industries have arisen, such as boat construction and summer tourism.

The Ville Close separates the working port from the yacht basin.

Population
Inhabitants of Concarneau are called in French Concarnois.

Breton language
In 2008, 2.16% of primary-school children attended bilingual schools, where Breton language is taught alongside French.

Sport
The football club US Concarneau is based in the town.

Personalities
 Michel Desjoyeaux, navigator
 Samantha (Sam) Davies, sailor
 Guy Cotten, founder of a clothes factory
 Stéphane Guivarc'h, French footballer, won the FIFA World Cup 1998 with the French national side
 Théophile Deyrolle and Alfred Guillou, founders of the Concarneau Art Colony.
 Valérie Hermann President of Ralph Lauren

International relations
Twinned towns:
   Bielefeld, Germany since 1969
   M'bour, Senegal since 1974
  Penzance, United Kingdom since 1982

Gallery

See also
Communes of the Finistère department
Walled town of Concarneau
Calypso (ship)
Lionel Floch
Fernand-Marie-Eugène Le Gout-Gérard
Henri Alphonse Barnoin
Henri Guinier

References

External links

 Official website 

 
Communes of Finistère
Populated coastal places in Brittany
Port cities and towns on the French Atlantic coast
Seaside resorts in France